Salamonie River State Forest is a  state forest in Wabash and Huntington counties, Indiana.

The forest is located along the Salamonie River and includes Salamonie Lake. The nearest city to the forest is Lagro. Salamonie State Forest is administered by the Indiana Department of Natural Resources. Salamonie River State Forest was established in the mid-1930s; the Civilian Conservation Corps reforested the site and built its recreational facilities.

The Hominy Ridge Shelter House was listed on the National Register of Historic Places in 1994.

References

Protected areas of Wabash County, Indiana
Protected areas of Huntington County, Indiana
Indiana state forests